Rubus deamii, known as Deam's dewberry, is a North American species of dewberry in section Procumbentes (formerly Flagellares) of the genus Rubus, a member of the rose family. It grows in scattered locations in the east-central United States and southern Canada, from Ontario south to Missouri, Tennessee, and West Virginia, but nowhere is it very common.

References

External links
Photo of herbarium specimen at Missouri Botanical Garden, collected in Missouri in 1933

deamii
Plants described in 1932
Flora of the United States
Flora of Ontario